Nur Diansyah (born 18 December 1998) is an Indonesian professional footballer who plays as a defender for Liga 1 club PSS Sleman, on loan from Borneo Samarinda.

Club career

Borneo FC
In 2017, Nur Diansyah signed a contract with Liga 1 club Borneo. He made his debut on 4 August 2019 in a match against PSS Sleman. On 4 August 2019, Nur Diansyah scored his first goal for Borneo against PSS Sleman in the 71st minute at the Segiri Stadium, Samarinda.

Persika Karawang (loan)
He was signed for Persika Karawang to play in Liga 2 in the 2018 season, on loan from Borneo.

Arema FC
He was signed for Arema FC to play in Liga 1 in the 2020 season. Nur Diansyah made his debut on 2 March 2020 in a match against TIRA-Persikabo. This season was suspended on 27 March 2020 due to the COVID-19 pandemic. The season was abandoned and was declared void on 20 January 2021.

Return to Borneo FC
In 2021, it was confirmed that Nur Diansyah would re-join Boneo, signing a year contract. Nur Diansyah made his debut on 4 September 2021 in a match against Persebaya Surabaya at the Wibawa Mukti Stadium, Cikarang.

PSS Sleman (loan)
He was signed for PSS Sleman to play in Liga 1 in the 2022 season, on loan from Boneo Samarinda. Nur Diansyah made his league debut on 29 July 2022 in a match against RANS Nusantara at the Pakansari Stadium, Cibinong.

Career statistics

Club

References

External links
 Nur Diansyah at Soccerway
 Nur Diansyah at Liga Indonesia

1998 births
Living people
Indonesian footballers
Liga 1 (Indonesia) players
Liga 2 (Indonesia) players
Borneo F.C. players
Arema F.C. players
PSS Sleman players
Association football defenders
People from Jombang Regency
Sportspeople from East Java